Jean Cléber Santos da Silva (born 29 April 1990), commonly known as Jean Cléber, is a Brazilian professional footballer who plays as a midfielder for Avaí.

References

External links
 

1990 births
Living people
Brazilian footballers
Brazilian expatriate footballers
Clube Atlético Linense players
América Futebol Clube (RN) players
Ceará Sporting Club players
Botafogo Futebol Clube (PB) players
Centro Sportivo Alagoano players
C.S. Marítimo players
Avaí FC players
Primeira Liga players
Campeonato Brasileiro Série A players
Campeonato Brasileiro Série B players
Expatriate footballers in Portugal
Footballers from São Paulo
Association football midfielders